Tom Paterson is a Scottish comic artist who drew characters for Fleetway in 1973–1990, and D.C Thomson from 1986 to 2012. As of 2013, he currently draws strips for Viz. He lives in Leith, with three children, and is a Hearts supporter.

Taking stylistic inspiration from Leo Baxendale's work on The Bash Street Kids, Paterson's talent as a cartoonist was discovered at the age of sixteen by original Dandy editor Albert Barnes, who was impressed with the cartoon samples Paterson had sent to him. Barnes offered the young artist a chance to collaborate with him on a strip called The Dangerous Dumplings (which would later be retooled as The Doyle Family for the Dandy), which was to become the leading strip of a new comic Barnes was developing, but the project was scrapped  when Barnes retired and Paterson was hired to work for IPC after leaving school. When Baxendale left IPC to publish his own work, Paterson took over as artist for several of his strips, including Sweeny Toddler and Grimly Feendish. Many of his comic strips feature a single, striped sock standing upright on the ground that appears once in each story that acts as a trademark.

He is famous for drawing comics such as:

Fleetway
 Grimly Feendish from Shiver and Shake 
 Buster from Buster comic
 Guy Gorilla from Whizzer and Chips
 Horace and Doris from Whizzer and Chips
 Strange Hill from Whizzer and Chips
 Robert's Robot from Whizzer and Chips
 Watford Gapp from Whizzer and Chips
 Crow Jak from Buster and Monster Fun
 Scooper from Jackpot
 Full 'O' Beans from Jackpot
 Jake's Seven from Jackpot
 The Park from Jackpot
 School Belle from School Fun
 Team Mates from Wow!
 Sweeny Toddler for Whoopee and later Whizzer and Chips

D.C Thomson

The Beano
 Calamity James
 The Numskulls
 Minnie the Minx
 Dennis the Menace
 Fred's Bed (reprints and new strips)
 Bash Street Kids - Singled Out
 Roger the Dodger
 Billy Whizz (Beano annuals 2008 and 2010)
 Ivy the Terrible
 Ball Boy
 Little Larry

Beezer
 The Banana Bunch
 Fred's Bed (Beezer and Topper)
 Phoot and Mouse
 The Numskulls

The Dandy
 Beryl the Peril
 Bananaman
 Brain Duane
 Euro School
 Fiddle 'o' Diddle
 Freddy the Fearless Fly
 Hyde & Shriek
 Laughing Planet
 Mutant Cow
 Rasper

Brain Duane
Brain Duane was a comic strip in The Dandy. It was about a nerdy bald inventor whose inventions would always go wrong. It was drawn by Tom Paterson between 1997 and 2005 before it was taken over by Duncan Scott. The strip disappeared when the comic became Dandy Xtreme. He returned in the 2012 Dandy Annual drawn by Steve Beckett. He was one of the characters featured in the PC game, Beanotown Racing.

Other

Viz
 Wee Radge Joe
 Nash Gordon
 Foul-Mouthed Super-Obese Mobility Scooter Woman

Moose Kid Comics
 Beelzababy

References

External links
 Official Site
  Fan site

20th-century births
Living people
Scottish comics artists
Year of birth missing (living people)
The Dandy people
The Beano people
Dennis the Menace and Gnasher